Mangifera sumbawaensis is a species of plant in the family Anacardiaceae. It is endemic to Indonesia. It is native to Sumbawa.

The fruit is harvested from the wild for local use as food.

References

sumbawaensis
Flora of the Lesser Sunda Islands
Vulnerable plants
Taxonomy articles created by Polbot
Taxa named by André Joseph Guillaume Henri Kostermans